Roosevelt station is a rapid transit station in San Juan, Puerto Rico, located in the Hato Rey Norte barrio and the Milla de Oro financial district. The station is named after the Franklin D. Roosevelt Avenue where it is located. The station opened on December 17, 2004. It features a tile mural by the artist Susana Espinosa entitled Encuentros Fugaces.

Nearby
 Milla de Oro
 Banco Popular
 Casa Club Sigma
 Plaza Las Américas (further west on Roosevelt Avenue)

Gallery

See also 
 List of San Juan Tren Urbano stations

References

External links 

Tren Urbano stations
Railway stations in the United States opened in 2004
2004 establishments in Puerto Rico